Beeron is a rural locality in the North Burnett Region, Queensland, Australia. In the  Beeron had a population of 14 people.

Geography
The Mundubbera – Durong Road (State Route 75) runs from north to south through the north-west of the locality. The Boyne River forms the north-eastern boundary, and the Beeron National Park occupies the south-eastern corner.

History 
The locality's name derives from a pastoral run name held in 1856 by William Strathdee. In 1872, it was written as Beerone but by 1878 it had become Beeron.

Beeron Road Provisional School opened on 5 September 1927. In 1952 it became Beeron Road State School. It closed on 11 December 1987. It was at 1070 Beeron Road now in Derri Derra. The school grounds are used as a sports and recreation area under the control of the North Burnett Regional Council.

In the  Beeron had a population of 14 people.

References 

North Burnett Region
Localities in Queensland